Vers une architecture, recently translated into English as Toward an Architecture but commonly known as Towards a New Architecture after the 1927 translation by Frederick Etchells, is a collection of essays written by Le Corbusier (Charles-Edouard Jeanneret), advocating for and exploring the concept of modern architecture. The book has had a lasting effect on the architectural profession, serving as the manifesto for a generation of architects, a subject of hatred for others, and unquestionably an important work of architectural theory. The architectural historian Reyner Banham wrote that its influence was "beyond that of any other architectural work published in this [20th] century to date", and that unparalleled influence has continued, unabated, into the 21st century.

The polemical book contains seven essays, all but one of which were published in the magazine L'Esprit Nouveau beginning in 1921. Each essay dismisses the contemporary trends of eclecticism and art deco, replacing them with architecture that was meant to be more than a stylistic experiment; rather, an architecture that would fundamentally change how humans interacted with buildings. This new mode of living derived from a new spirit defining the industrial age, demanding a rebirth of architecture based on function and a new aesthetic based on pure form.

The authorship of the book was complex. Le Corbusier co-owned L'Esprit Nouveau with fellow purist painter Amédée Ozenfant. They co-signed many of the original essays as "Le Corbusier-Saugnier," and Ozenfant had been a close friend of Corbusier. Ozenfant denied having written the book, claiming that the essays were based on conversations the two had had together about theories written by Auguste Perret and Adolf Loos. As the book became more known, their fight became more heated. Ozenfant began to claim not only more credit for authorship, but also that Le Corbusier had purposefully excluded him by dedicating the original edition to Ozenfant.

The English translation of the book has also been a source of controversy with regard to its change of style and very specific alterations to the text. The alterations have generated criticism and required correction, even as some of them began to define architectural language. A new translation was released in 2007 that is meant to be truer to Le Corbusier's intention.

L-C buildings featured

p.14. A city of towers 1920

p.15. A city of towers 1923.

p.17. Towns built on piles 1915.

p.60. Streets with set-backs 1920.

p.61. Roof garden on a private house at Auteuil.

p.76. A villa 1916.

p.77. A house 1923.

p.78. A Villa back elevation 1916.

p.79. Two houses at Auteuil 1924.

p.212/3. A group of mass-production houses in reinforced concrete 1915.
concrete houses 1920.

p.216/7. House in reinforced concrete 1915.

p.218. plan of housing scheme in reinforced concrete.
house in reinforced concrete. House and workshop.

p.219. Interior of a reinforced concrete house. 1915.

p.220. Artists house 1922.
houses of coarse concrete 1919.

p.221. Mass production workmen's houses.

p.222. Mass production house 1921.
Mass production villa 1922.

p.223. A 'Citrohan' house 1921.

p.224/5. A 'Monol' House 1919.
a 'Monol' building.

p.226. A seaside villa constructed with mass production units 1921.
Plan of the villa showing the piers regularly disposed.

p.227. interior of the seaside villa.
interior of a 'Monol' house arranged as a middle class home.

p.228. Freehold maisonettes.
The hanging gardens.

P.229. A great rent purchase scheme 1922.

p.230. Freehold maisonettes.

p.231. freehold maisonettes.

p.232. New dwellings at Bordeaux.

p.233. Housing scheme for garden cities on the honeycomb principle.

p.234. Bordeaux Pessac 1924 modern dwellings.

p.235. Bordeaux Pessac.

p.236/7. mass production artisan's dwellings 1924.

p.238. Housing scheme 1924.

p.239. One of the cells of a freehold maisonette block 1924.

p.240. A villa at Bordeaux 1925.

p.241. A villa at Bordeaux. 

p.242/3. University quarter.

p.244. An artist's studio.

See also
 Le Corbusier's Five Points of Architecture

Editions
First published in England 1927.

Revised edition 1946.

reprinted, 1948,1952, 1956, 1959, 1963, 1965.

Paperback edition 1970.

reprinted 1972.

References

Sources
Le Corbusier. Toward an Architecture. Translated by John Goodman. Los Angeles: Getty Research Institute, 2007
Le Corbusier. Towards a New Architecture. Translated by Frederick Etchells. London: J. Rodker, 1931. Reprint  New York: Dover Publications, 1985.
1929 French edition digitized at Bibliothèque Nationale de France

1923 books
Architecture books
Le Corbusier
1923 in art